Allen Lord Bradford (born August 31, 1988) is a former American football linebacker. He was drafted by the Tampa Bay Buccaneers in the sixth round of the 2011 NFL Draft. He played college football at USC. Bradford has also played for the Cleveland Browns and New York Giants as of 2014.

Early life
Bradford played running back and linebacker at Colton High School, where he played on the varsity squad for four years. As a senior in 2005, he ran for 1,869 yards on 143 carries with 29 touchdowns, and caught 20 passes for 429 yards with six touchdowns, plus recorded 157 tackles, 12.0 sacks, four forced fumbles and one fumble recovery.

College career
Bradford played for current Seahawks head coach Pete Carroll at USC, where he finished his career with 1,585 yards rushing on 267 carries (5.9 average) and 16 touchdowns in 52 games played. Rushed for 7.2 yards per carry in 2010, good for second in the nation. Was USC’s No. 2 rusher in 2009, earning All-Pac-10 honorable mention. Majored in American studies and ethnicity.

Professional career

Seattle Seahawks
Bradford was claimed off waivers by the Seattle Seahawks on October 17, 2011.

He was waived two days later, and re-signed to the Seahawks' practice squad on October 21. He was switched to linebacker after re-signing with the Seahawks.

On December 28, 2012 Bradford was signed to the Seahawks 53-man roster. Bradford may be one of the first players in modern NFL history to be drafted as a running back and go on to play linebacker. He rushed for 13 yards on five carries and scored no touchdowns as a running back.

He was released on September 11, 2013 to make space for tight end Kellen Davis.

New York Giants
Bradford was claimed off waivers by the New York Giants on September 12, 2013. He was released on May 12, 2014.

Jacksonville Jaguars
Bradford was claimed off waivers by the Jacksonville Jaguars on May 13, 2014. The Jaguars released Bradford on August 24, 2014.

Cleveland Browns
Bradford signed with the Browns' practice squad on September 16, 2014.

Seattle Seahawks (third stint)
On November 12, 2014, Bradford was resigned again by the Seahawks. Bradford, in a locker-room interview on re-joining of the Seattle football team, stated how his return to Seattle "feels like home. I’m close to all the guys. They welcomed me with open arms. And I love being here. There’s not a place like this. So I’m just appreciative and I just want to work."

Personal life
Bradford is from Colton, California. At Colton High School, Bradford was a linebacker and running back. Bradford has two children, Mahlia Liana Bradford and Aiden Lord Bradford. On July 2, 2016, he married Vanessa Portillo.

References

External links
Atlanta Falcons bio
Allen Bradford on Twitter

1988 births
Living people
American football linebackers
American football running backs
Atlanta Falcons players
Cleveland Browns players
Jacksonville Jaguars players
New York Giants players
People from Colton, California
Players of American football from California
Seattle Seahawks players
Sportspeople from San Bernardino, California
Tampa Bay Buccaneers players
USC Trojans football players